The Melvold Nunataks are a group of small nunataks located  west of Mount Harding in the Grove Mountains of Antarctica. They were mapped by Australian National Antarctic Research Expeditions from air photos, 1956–60, and were named by the Antarctic Names Committee of Australia for C.D. Melvold, a radio officer at Mawson Station in 1962.

References

Nunataks of Princess Elizabeth Land